JeVon McCormick is an American author, public speaker and businessman. In 2016, author Tucker Max hired McCormick as CEO of Scribe Media, formerly known as Book in a Box, an Austin-based book writing and publishing company, after working together on McCormick's book, I Got There: How I Overcame Racism, Poverty, and Abuse to Achieve the American Dream.

Education
In his book, I Got There, McCormick says that he had difficulty even completing high school, and never attended college.

Career
McCormick was the President of Headspring Systems from 2013 to 2016. In 2016, McCormick was hired by Tucker Max to be the CEO of Scribe Media, a company that helps people write and publish books.

Personal
McCormick was born the son of a drug-dealing pimp and has spoken publicly about how he worked his way up to become a CEO.
He lives in Austin, Texas with his wife Megan and their four children.

References

21st-century American non-fiction writers
American writers
American male non-fiction writers
1971 births
Living people
21st-century American male writers